Charles-Eugène Guye (October 15, 1866 – July 15, 1942) was a Swiss physicist. He was born in Champvent and died in Geneva.

Life and works 
Guye studied physics at the University of Geneva, where he received his doctorate in 1889, studying the phenomenon of optical rotatory dispersion.

From 1890 to 1892 Charles-Eugène worked as a Privatdozent (lecturer) in Geneva, and from 1893 to 1900 he was a Privatdozent at Zurich Polytechnic (now the Federal Institute of Technology Zurich ETH Zurich), switching his research interests to electrical engineering. Albert Einstein was one of his students. From 1900 to 1930 he was professor and director of the Physics Institute of the University of Geneva.

His research focus was in the fields of electric currents, magnetism, and electrical discharges in gases. Starting in 1907 and continuing for over a decade, he and his students Simon Ratnowsky and Charles Lavanchy conducted experiments that demonstrated the dependence of the electron mass on its speed, with results supporting the predictions of Lorentz, Einstein, and the special theory of relativity against Max Abraham's rival theory of the electron.

He participated in the 5th and 7th Solvay Conferences, and was the author or co-author of over 200 papers in physics and several popular books, including philosophical works on the biological-physical-chemical basis of evolution and the limits of physics and biology.

His older brother, Philippe-Auguste (1862–1922), was a distinguished chemist.

External links 
 Guye, Charles-Eugène in the Complete Dictionary of Scientific Biography 
 Historisches Lexikon der Schweiz

References 

1866 births
1942 deaths
Swiss physicists